Fazenda de Verão (English: Summer Farm) was a Brazilian reality television show, which premiered on October 31, 2012 during the Southern Hemisphere summer. It was broadcast by RecordTV television network.

The series was a spin-off of A Fazenda, but with ordinary people, instead of the celebrities playing the role of housemates. Rodrigo Faro was the host, replacing Britto Junior from the main celebrity version. The grand prize was R$1 million with tax allowances.

On March 26, 2013, it was confirmed that the series had been canceled and would not be returning for a second season.

Format
The show features 22 contestants who are sequestered in the Farm with no contact to or from the outside world. while having all their steps followed by cameras around-the-clock. Each week, the contestants take part in several compulsory challenges that determine who will win the power in the Farm.

Each housemate must nominate one of their fellow housemates to face the public vote. "Voting to save" was used for the public vote as opposed to the "vote to evict" method generally used in main celebrity series.

Seasons

Ratings
All numbers are in points and provided by IBOPE.

 Each point represents 60.000 households in São Paulo.

Season 1 (2012)

Production
National applications run from September 7, 2012 until October 19, 2012. Out of more than 64.000 applicants, 200 were chosen as semi-finalists for an interview during October 2012.

From these semi-finalists, twenty-two were chosen to participate in the show between October 2012 to January 2013.

Contestants
The cast list was released four different days: the first six contestants (Claudia, Dan, Haysam, Ísis, Karine and Rodrigo S.) were revealed on October 25; another six (Bianca, Flávia, Halan, Nuelle, Rodrigo C. and Sacramento) on October 26; four more (Gabriela, Natália, Thyago and Victor) on October 28. The final four contestants (Angelis, Cacá, Leandro and Raphael) were revealed on November 1, as part of a twist on this season.

Biographical information according to Record official series site, plus footnoted additions.(ages stated are at time of contest)

Guest

Voting history
 Key
  – Contestant is a member of Team Ant and have to do all the work in the farm.
  – Contestant is a member of Team Cicada and is not allow to work in the farm.

Notes
 : During the first week, Angelis, Cacá, Leandro and Raphael lived in the barn and the public voted for two of them (1 man and 1 woman) to enter in the main house. Cacá and Leandro received the fewest votes to enter and therefore, were both evicted on day 8.
 : Sacramento accidentally revealed his secret vote on Isis, so his second nomination was voied.
 : For winning the duel, Haysam won the right to open a mystery envelope. It was revealed during the nominations that he won R$10,000. He should also give immunity to someone from his team (including himself). He chose to give immunity to Natália.
 : Lucas entered in the farm after the nominations of week 4 and six days later was ejected for misconduct.
 : Angelis and Manoella received the most nominations in the first round with 4 each. Team Cicada decided as a group, that Angelis would be the first nominee. 
 :  For winning the duel, Natália won the right to open a mystery envelope. It was revealed during the nominations that she gained an immunity and the power of decide the casting votes. Raphael and Manoella received the most nominations in Team Ant with 3 each and Natália decided that Raphael would be the team nominee. Finally she decided that Raphael would be the second nominee instead of Angelis (the Team Cicada nominee).
 : Exceptionally, this eviction took place on Friday (day 46) due to the Rede Record's broadcast of the Ídolos 2012 two-hour season finale on Thursday night.
 : For winning the duel, Rodrigo C. won the right to open a mystery envelope. It was revealed during the nominations that he gained the power to exclude a participant from voting. He chose Angelis.
 : Dan and Manoella received the most nominations in Team Ant with 2 each. Isis, the immune of the week, chose Dan to be the team nominee. 
 :  For winning the duel, Dan won the right to open a mystery envelope. It was revealed during the nominations that he gained a power to overthrow the house votes after the nominations. He had the casting vote and chose Natália to replace Flávia as first nominee and the six votes against her did not count.
 : Thyago and Victor received the most nominations in Team Ant with 2 each. Angelis, the immune of the week, chose Victor to be the team nominee. 
 : For winning the duel, Victor won the right to open a mystery envelope. It was revealed before the nominations that he gained a power to determine the nominees of the week. He chose Flávia and Manoella for eviction.
 : After Dan was nominated by the house vote, Ísis was saved first by a random draw. Then, Ísis saved Victor, who saved Thyago, who saved Angelis, so Manoella became the second nominee.
 : On day 81, the final five competed in a nomination challenge. Victor finished in first place and won a car, while Angelis became the first nominee after came in last. The second nominee will be decided by the house vote.
 : On day 89, the final four competed in the final immunity challenge for place in the final. Thyago was the winner and became the first finalist of the season, so Angelis, Ísis and Victor were automatically nominated for eviction by default.

Ratings and reception

Brazilian ratings
All numbers are in points and provided by IBOPE.

 Each point represents 60.000 households in São Paulo.
Notes
 Episodes 47 and 53 aired during Christmas Eve (Monday, December 24) and New Year's Eve (Monday, December 31) respectively, and scored an all-time low number of viewers for A Fazenda series.

References

External links
Fazenda de Verão Official Site 

2012 Brazilian television series debuts
2012 in Brazilian television
2012 Brazilian television seasons
A Fazenda
Reality television spin-offs
2013 Brazilian television seasons
2013 Brazilian television series endings
Brazilian reality television series
Portuguese-language television shows